Onykia ingens, the greater hooked squid, is a species of squid in the family Onychoteuthidae. It occurs worldwide in subantarctic oceans.

Although O. ingens was long attributed to the genus Moroteuthis, several authors have recently agreed that Moroteuthis is a junior synonym of Onykia.

Size and growth

The size of a fully grown O. ingens, inclusive of tentacles, is currently unknown. Many estimates, however, predict that the mantle may reach lengths of up to 94 cm (37 in). Research has found that egg sizes of the squid average 2.1 mm inside mature females, while juveniles average 4.6 mm or larger. Juveniles are presumed to live near the surface, until they reach a mantle length of approximately 200 mm, at which time they relocate to deeper water, and larger prey. O. ingens exhibit sexual dimorphism, with females growing linearly twice as fast as males, and reaching a fully mature size of more than five times that of male counterparts.

Penis elongation has been observed in this species; when erect, the penis may be as long as the mantle, head and arms combined. As such, deep water squid like M. ingens have the greatest known penis length relative to body size of all mobile animals, second in the entire animal kingdom only to certain sessile barnacles.

Ecology
It is generally accepted that there are large dietary variations between large and small O. ingens. One of the most common findings is that juvenile squid (>200 mm ML) consume a greater percentage of crustaceans and cephalopods compared to their size than mature squid, which consume a large percentage of fish and virtually no crustaceans. Globally, however, myctophid fish (lantern fish) are seen as common prey.  Larger squid are known to practice cannibalism (accounting for up to 6% of diet).

O. ingens, as with many (if not all) large squid, has a number of predators. These include the patagonian toothfish, king penguin, wandering albatross, pilot whale, bottlenose whale, dwarf sperm whale, sperm whale, and other types of squid.

References

External links

Tree of Life web project: Onykia ingens
First observation of a double tentacle bifurcation in cephalopods

Squid
Cephalopods described in 1881
Taxa named by Edgar Albert Smith